20th NSFC Awards
January 3, 1986

Best Film: 
 Ran 
The 20th National Society of Film Critics Awards, given on 3 January 1986, honored the best filmmaking of 1985.

Winners

Best Picture 
1. Ran
2. Prizzi's Honor
2. The Purple Rose of Cairo

Best Director 
1. John Huston – Prizzi's Honor
2. Akira Kurosawa – Ran

Best Actor 
1. Jack Nicholson – Prizzi's Honor
2. William Hurt – Kiss of the Spider Woman

Best Actress 
1. Vanessa Redgrave – Wetherby
2. Jessica Lange – Sweet Dreams
3. Norma Aleandro – The Official Story (La historia oficial)

Best Supporting Actor 
1. John Gielgud – Plenty and The Shooting Party
2. William Hickey – Prizzi's Honor
3. Ian Holm – Wetherby, Brazil and Dance with a Stranger
4. Klaus Maria Brandauer – Out of Africa

Best Supporting Actress 
1. Anjelica Huston – Prizzi's Honor
2. Mieko Harada – Ran

Best Screenplay 
1. Albert Brooks and Monica Johnson – Lost in America
2. Woody Allen – The Purple Rose of Cairo
3. Terry Gilliam, Tom Stoppard and Charles McKeown – Brazil
3. Richard Condon and Janet Roach – Prizzi's Honor

Best Cinematography 
1. Takao Saito, Masaharu Ueda and Asakazu Nakai – Ran
2. Kiyoshi Hasegawa – The Makioka Sisters (Sasame-yuki)
3. Michael Ballhaus – After Hours

Best Documentary 
1. Shoah
2. 28 Up
3. Streetwise

References

External links
Past Awards

1985
National Society of Film Critics Awards
National Society of Film Critics Awards
National Society of Film Critics Awards